Twan Smits (born 20 December 1985 in Weurt) is a footballer who plays as a defensive midfielder for Juliana '31 in the Dutch Derde Divisie. Smits also is the captain of the Groesbeek side since 2011. Originally a youth product from N.E.C., he played first team football for Juliana '31 for five years before moving to Achilles '29 in the 2009 summer. Smits also works as an account manager for former youth club and Eredivisie side N.E.C.

References

External links
 Voetbal International profile 

1985 births
Living people
Dutch footballers
Association football midfielders
Eerste Divisie players
Derde Divisie players
Achilles '29 players
Footballers from Gelderland
De Treffers players
Juliana '31 players
NEC Nijmegen players